Prolyl 3-hydroxylase 3 is an enzyme that in humans is encoded by the LEPREL2 gene.

References

Further reading